Cuieiras River may refer to:

 Cuieiras River (Demini River), a river in the Barcelos municipality of Amazonas state in north-western Brazil.
 Cuieiras River (Rio Negro), a river in the Maués municipality of Amazonas state in north-western Brazil.